The 1923 election of the Speaker of the New Zealand House of Representatives occurred on 7 February 1923, following the 1922 general election result. The election saw the incumbent speaker Sir Frederic Lang lose his parliamentary seat. It resulted in the election of Independent  MP Charles Statham as Speaker.

Nominated candidates
Two candidates were nominated:
 James McCombs, MP for  – Labour Party
 Charles Statham, MP for  – Independent

Election
The election was conducted by means of a conventional parliamentary motion. The Clerk of the House of Representatives conducted a vote on the question of the election of the Speaker.

The following table gives the election results:

How each MP voted:

References

Speaker of the House of Representatives election
Speaker of the House of Representatives of New Zealand elections